The Manitowish Chain O Lakes is a chain of lakes consisting of 10 lakes that includes: Rest Lake (809 acres), Stone Lake (139 acres), Fawn Lake (74 acres), Clear Lake (555 acres), Spider Lake (272 acres), Island Lake (1023 acres), Manitowish Lake (496 acres), Little Star Lake (245 acres), Wild Rice Lake (379 acres), and Alder Lake (274 acres). The chain is located in Manitowish Waters in Vilas County, Wisconsin, United States. The chain is known for its fishing. Little Star Lake is home to Little Bohemia Lodge where John Dillinger had his famous shootout. Also the movie Public Enemies was filmed there.

The lakes are fed by the Manitowish River, which drains into the Chippewa River basin and ultimately the Upper Mississippi River.

References

External links
Manitowish Waters Lake Association

Lakes of Vilas County, Wisconsin
Lakes of Wisconsin
Tourist attractions in Vilas County, Wisconsin